Marta Kostyuk and Tereza Martincová defeated the defending champion Tereza Mihalíková and her partner Cristina Bucșa in the final,   6–4, 6–0 to win the doubles tennis title at the 2022 WTA Slovenia Open. It was Kostyuk's as well as Martincová's first WTA Tour doubles title.

Anna Kalinskaya and Mihalíková were the reigning champions,  but Kalinskaya withdrew before the tournament.

Seeds

Draw

Draw

References

Main draw

Zavarovalnica Sava Portorož - Doubles